Jerry Gordon is an American radio broadcaster. He is the afternoon news anchor on KNIH in Las Vegas, Nevada.  His voice-over work included 10 years as "the voice of Disney." He previously worked at KSFO in San Francisco.
He is originally from New York City, New York. He was born in Norwich, Connecticut.

Notes 

American radio news anchors
Radio personalities from the Las Vegas Valley
Radio personalities from San Francisco
Living people
Year of birth missing (living people)